Tom Dennie (17 September 1922 – 10 February 2009) was a Canadian cross-country skier who competed in the 1948 Winter Olympics.

References

1922 births
2009 deaths
Canadian male cross-country skiers
Olympic cross-country skiers of Canada
Cross-country skiers at the 1948 Winter Olympics